The Men's time trial C4 road cycling event at the 2016 Summer Paralympics took place on 14 September at Flamengo Park, Pontal. Nine riders from eight nations competed.

The C4 category is for cyclists with upper or lower limb impairments and low-level neurological impairment.

Results

References

Men's road time trial C4